Blue Hodge is an album recorded by American jazz saxophonist Johnny Hodges featuring performances recorded in 1961 and released on the Verve label.

Reception

The Allmusic site awarded the album 3 stars. Blue Hodge was the first of eight LPs released between 1961 and 1967 that featured Johnny Hodges and Wild Bill Davis in a small-group jazz context. While most of the Hodges-Davis sessions feature a mix of traditional popular music standards and jazz compositions written by Hodges, Duke Ellington, and musicians associated with Duke Ellington, Blue Hodge features three compositions by Gary McFarland. McFarland was still relatively unknown at the time of the recording, though during the next two years, he arranged albums for Stan Getz and Bill Evans that allowed him to launch his own recording career. Also notable is the presence of Sam Jones on bass and Louis Hayes on drums, both of whom were in the midst of a several-year stint as the part of the Cannonball Adderley Quintet.

Track listing
 "And Then Some" (Johnny Hodges) - 4:00
 "I Wonder Why" (Mercer Ellington) - 4:26
 "Azure Te" (Duke Ellington, Irving Mills) - 2:55
 "Blue Hodge" (Gary McFarland) - 6:21
 "Hodge Podge" (Duke Ellington, Johnny Hodges) - 4:00
 "It Shouldn't Happen to a Dream" (Duke Ellington, Don George, Johnny Hodges) - 2:08
 "Why Are You Blue?" (McFarland) - 2:23
 "Knuckles" (McFarland) - 5:09
 "Stand By Blues" (Johnny Hodges) - 4:27
 "There Is No Greater Love" (Isham Jones, Marty Symes) - 3:24

Personnel
Johnny Hodges - alto saxophone
Wild Bill Davis - organ
Les Spann - guitar, flute
Sam Jones - bass
Louis Hayes - drums

References

Johnny Hodges albums
1961 albums
Albums produced by Creed Taylor
Verve Records albums
Albums recorded at Van Gelder Studio